Penwortham Cop Lane was a railway station on the West Lancashire Railway in England. It served the town of Penwortham in Lancashire. It was between Higher Penwortham and Lower Penwortham. It was opened by the Lancashire and Yorkshire Railway in 1911 as Cop Lane Halt. It was renamed to its later name on 30 March 1940 and was closed by British Rail in 1964.

The cutting which once carried the railway under Cop Lane has been widened and now carries the A59 Penwortham bypass.

References

Disused railway stations in South Ribble
Former Lancashire and Yorkshire Railway stations
Railway stations in Great Britain opened in 1911
Beeching closures in England
Railway stations in Great Britain closed in 1964